Héctor Rafael García-Godoy Cáceres (Moca, January 11, 1921 – Santo Domingo, April 20, 1970) was a politician from the Dominican Republic. He served as president of the Dominican Republic from September 3, 1965, until July 1, 1966, following the Dominican Civil War.

García-Godoy was the grandson of the Cuban-born Dominican poet Federico García Godoy and the Dominican President Ramón Cáceres. He was also the cousin of the Dominican painter Darío Suro.

Service

After serving as a diplomat in the mid-1940s, García-Godoy was employed at the Foreign Ministry and served on the board of directors of the Reserve Bank. He was appointed Deputy Chairman of the Central Bank of the Dominican Republic in 1955. In 1963, he served as foreign minister under Juan Bosch, whose government was overthrown later that year. Afterward he temporarily acted as president and organized the 1966 elections in which Joaquín Balaguer regained the presidency. Balaguer subsequently appointed him as ambassador to the United States in 1966, serving until 1969.

References
Biography at the Enciclopedia Virtual Dominicana

1921 births
1970 deaths
20th-century Dominican Republic politicians
People from Espaillat Province
People from Moca, Dominican Republic
Dominican Republic people of Cuban descent
Dominican Republic people of English descent
Dominican Republic people of Galician descent
Dominican Republic people of Spanish descent
Presidents of the Dominican Republic
Dominican Republic expatriates in the United States
White Dominicans